Bellator MMA & Glory: Dynamite 1 (also known as Bellator 142: Dynamite 1) was a mixed martial arts and kickboxing hybrid event held on September 19, 2015 at the SAP Center in San Jose, California, USA. The event aired live and free in prime time on Spike.

Background
The event was announced on air during a special pre-Bellator 138 press conference as a three-tier hybrid show with Glory Kickboxing. Similar super-shows have long taken place in Japan. As a tribute to these, the main card fighters were introduced as a group at the top of the TV broadcast by Lenne Hardt, best known for her work as English-language ring announcer for various Japanese MMA and kickboxing promotions. The event was headlined by a Bellator Light Heavyweight Championship fight between current champion Liam McGeary and UFC veteran Tito Ortiz.

The second tier of the show was a Glory Kickboxing card that was headlined by a bout for the vacant Glory Light Heavyweight Championship between Saulo Cavalari and Zack Mwekassa. This portion of the card also featured Bellator mixed martial artist Paul Daley.

The third tier of the show was a one night, four-man light heavyweight tournament featuring Phil Davis, Muhammed Lawal, Emanuel Newton and Linton Vassell. The winner of this tournament will secure a title shot against the winner of the title fight between McGeary and Ortiz. Muhammed Lawal was slated to face-off against Phil Davis in the Bellator Light Heavyweight Tournament Final. However, Lawal was pulled out of the bout at the last minute due to injury and was replaced by Bellator Light Heavyweight Tournament Alternate winner Francis Carmont. 

Four bouts - Victor Jones vs. David Blanco, Gloria Telles vs. Alysia Cortez, Jose Palacios vs. TJ Arcengal and Brandon Hester vs. DeMarco Villalona - took place simultaneously inside the cage and the ring.

During intermission after the Phil Davis vs. Francis Carmont light heavyweight tournament finale bout and shortly before the Liam McGeary (c) vs. Tito Ortiz light heavyweight championship fight, Bellator MMA ring announcer Michael C. Williams announced to the live SAP Center at San Jose crowd attendance of 11,732. 

Thus making Bellator MMA & Glory: Dynamite 1 the largest attended show in Bellator MMA history, until being surpassed by Bellator 149 at the Toyota Center in Houston, TX with a live paid crowd attendance of 14,209.  Bellator 149 (Shamrock vs. Gracie III) had a double main event featuring a heavyweight battle between Miami, FL Dade County street fighters Kimbo Slice and Dada 5000. Along with MMA light heavyweight pioneers Ken Shamrock and Royce Gracie facing off for the 3rd time.

Results

Bellator Light Heavyweight Tournament bracket

Alternate Carmont replaced an injured Lawal in the finals.

See also
Bellator MMA in 2015
2015 in Glory

References

External links
Bellator
Glory

Bellator MMA events
2015 in mixed martial arts
Glory (kickboxing) events
2015 in kickboxing
Kickboxing in the United States
Events in San Jose, California